The Okhotsk-Chukotka Volcanic Belt (OCVB) is a Cretaceous volcanic belt in the Russian Far East region of northeast Asia.  

It is found in Chukotka Autonomous Okrug and Khabarovsk Krai of northeastern Russia.

Geology

The volcanism within the volcanic belt was related to the subduction of the ancient Kula Plate, which moved in a northward direction about 55 million years ago.

References
New 40Ar/39Ar ages of Cretaceous continental volcanics from central Chukotka: implications for initiation and duration of volcanism within northern part of the Okhotsk Chukotka Volcanic Belt (northeastern Eurasia), by V. O. Ispolatov, P. L. Tikhomirov, M. Heizler, and I. Yu. Cherepanova.

Volcanic belts
Volcanism of Russia
Geology of the Russian Far East
Geography of Chukotka Autonomous Okrug
Geography of Khabarovsk Krai
Cretaceous Asia